Meaning most commonly refers to:

 Meaning (linguistics), meaning which is communicated through the use of language
 Meaning (philosophy), definition, elements, and types of meaning discussed in philosophy
 Meaning (non-linguistic), a general term of art to capture senses of the word "meaning", independent from its linguistic uses
 The meaning of life, the significance, purpose, or worth of human existence

Meaning may also refer to:
 Meaning (psychology), epistemological position, in psychology as well as philosophy, linguistics, semiotics and sociology
 Meaning (semiotics), the distribution of signs in sign relations
 Meaning (existential), the meaning of life in contemporary existentialism

Arts and entertainment
 Meanings (album), a 2004 album by Gad Elbaz
 "Meaning" (House), a 2006 episode of the TV series House
 Meaning (music), the philosophical question of meaning in relation to music
"The Meaning", a song on Discipline (Janet Jackson album) (2008)
The Meaning (album), a 2011 album by Layzie Bone

See also

 Hermeneutics, the theory of text interpretation
 Linguistics, the scientific study of language
 Logotherapy, psychotherapy based on an existential analysis
 Meant to Be (disambiguation)
 Notion (disambiguation)
 Proposition (disambiguation)
 Semantics, the study of meaning
 Significance (disambiguation)